Elections will be held in Caraga for seats in the House of Representatives of the Philippines on May 13, 2013.

Summary

Agusan del Norte

1st District
Incumbent Jose Aquino II is not running for the position; instead, he is running for Butuan's mayorship. His Lakas–CMD party did not name a nominee in this district.

2nd District
Incumbent Angelica Amante-Matba is not running. Her brother incumbent Governor Erlpe John Amante is running unopposed.

Agusan del Sur

1st District
Maria Valentina Plaza is the incumbent.

2nd District
Evelyn Mellana is the incumbent. She will face former Representative Rodolfo Plaza.

Dinagat Islands
Incumbent Ruben Ecleo Jr. has been dropped from the rolls of the House of Representatives after the Supreme Court ruled that the Sandiganbayan's conviction of Ecleo on graft was valid. No special election was held. Dinagat Mayor Gwendolyn Ecleo is his party's nominee. She will face incumbent Akbayan Partylist Representative Kaka Bag-ao, who is running as guest candidate of the Liberal Party.

Surigao del Norte

1st District
Francisco Matugas is the Incumbent.

2nd District
Guillermo Romarate Jr. is Incumbent.

Surigao del Sur

1st District
Philip Pichay is Incumbent.

2nd District
Florencio Garay is the Incumbent.

References

2013 Philippine general election
Lower house elections in Caraga